Dimitri Dimakopoulos  (born 14 September 1929 – 7 November 1995) was a Greek-Canadian architect. He was best known for having been involved in the design of several notable buildings in Downtown Montreal.

Early life
Dimakopoulos was born in Athens, Greece, on September 14, 1929. He grew up in Athens before emigrating to Montreal, Quebec, Canada, in 1948. He continued his education at the School of Architecture at McGill University. During this period, he earned awards from Anglin Norcross and Hobbs Glass and designed several theatres and concert halls. As the final work during his studies, Dimakopoulos designed the foundations of the Queen Elizabeth Auditorium in Vancouver, British Columbia, in 1954.

Career
In 1955, he participated in the creation of the Affleck, Desbarats, Dimakopoulos, Lebensold, Michaud & Sise architecture firm, which changed names in 1970 to become ARCOP (Architects in Co-Partnership). This firm worked with Henry N. Cobb and Ieoh Ming Pei on the design of Place Ville-Marie, a landmark skyscraper in Downtown Montreal. The firm later worked on other major projects in Quebec and the rest of Canada, including Expo 67, Place Bonaventure in Montreal, and the National Arts Centre in Ottawa, Ontario.

In 1968, he created a new firm, "Dimakopoulos & Associates". The firm designed projects in Quebec City, Gatineau, Winnipeg and Hong Kong. From 1991 to 1992, alongside Lemay & Associates, Dimakopoulos & Associates designed 1000 de La Gauchetière, the tallest building in Montreal.

Works
 1955 - Queen Elizabeth Auditorium, Vancouver
 1961 - Centre municipal de Laval
 1962 - Fathers of Confederation Building, Charlottetown, Prince Edward Island
 1962 - Place Ville-Marie, Montreal
 1966 - Salle Wilfrid-Pelletier, Place des Arts, Montreal
 1968 - Saint George Greek Orthodox Cathedral, Montreal
 1972 - Hôtel Le Concorde, Quebec City
 1974 - Université du Québec à Montréal
 1981 - Palais de Justice, Quebec City
 1985 - Alexis Nihon Plaza, Montreal
 1986 - La Laurentienne Building, Montreal
 1992 - Pavillon des Sciences de la Gestion (UQÀM), Montreal
 1993 - 1000 de La Gauchetière, Montreal

Awards and distinctions
 1975 - Inducted as a Member in the Royal Canadian Academy of Arts
 1985 - Inducted as a Knight in the National Order of Quebec

References

1929 births
1995 deaths
20th-century Canadian architects
Greek emigrants to Canada
Architects from Athens
Architects from Montreal
Members of the Royal Canadian Academy of Arts
Knights of the National Order of Quebec
McGill School of Architecture alumni